Gössenberg is a former municipality in the district of Liezen in Styria, Austria. Since the 2015 Styria municipal structural reform, it is part of the municipality Aich.

References

Cities and towns in Liezen District